Lieutenant-General Sir Thomas Anthony Beckett,  (born 1962) is a former British Army officer. He served as Chief of Staff for the International Security Assistance Force in Afghanistan.

Early life and education
Beckett was born in 1962 in Bahrain. He was educated at Blackrock College, an all-boys Catholic school in Dublin, Ireland. During his army career, he studied at Cranfield University: he graduated with a Master of Arts (MA) degree in military studies in 1994 and a Master of Science (MSc) degree in global security in 2002.

Military career
Beckett was commissioned into the Queen's Royal Irish Hussars in 1984. After serving in the Gulf War in 1991 and Sierra Leone Civil War in 2001, he became commanding officer of 1st Battalion the Parachute Regiment in 2002 in which role he was deployed for the Invasion of Iraq in 2003. 

He became Deputy Director, Higher Command and Staff Course in 2005, Commander of 20th Armoured Brigade in 2007 (in which role he was again deployed to Iraq) and Director Commitments at Headquarters Land Forces in 2009. He went on to be Deputy Commander of the NATO Rapid Deployable Italian Corps in July 2010 in which role was deployed as Chief of Staff for the International Security Assistance Force in Afghanistan. Beckett became Defence Senior Advisor Middle East at the Ministry of Defence with the rank of lieutenant-general in late 2014. In the 2018 Queen's Birthday Honours, he was appointed Knight Commander of the Order of the Bath (KCB).

Beckett retired from the British Army in 2018.

Later career
Since 2018, Beckett has been executive director of International Institute for Strategic Studies - Middle East.

References

1962 births
British Army lieutenant generals
Knights Commander of the Order of the Bath
Commanders of the Order of the British Empire
Living people
NATO military personnel
Queen's Royal Irish Hussars officers
British Parachute Regiment officers
British Army personnel of the Iraq War
British Army personnel of the Gulf War
British military personnel of the Sierra Leone Civil War
British Army personnel of the War in Afghanistan (2001–2021)
People educated at Blackrock College
Alumni of Cranfield University